Georg Andersson (born 1936) is a Swedish politician and a member of the Social Democratic Party. He held various cabinet posts and was a member of the Riksdag between 1971 and 1995.

Biography
Andersson was born in 1936. He joined the Social Democratic Party which he represented at the Riksdag from 1971 to 1995. 

Andersson was appointed minister of immigration in 1986, replacing Anita Gradin in the post. When he was in office he openly criticized the migration policies of Sweden arguing that Sweden had not responded the applications in a fair manner and that those given permission to live in the country had not been treated as equal fellows and could not find a job. 

He was minister of communications (transport) between 1989 and 1991 in the first and second cabinet of Prime Minister Ingvar Carlsson. During his term Andersson visited Seoul in 1989. Sweden and Denmark signed an agreement to build the Øresund Bridge on 23 March 1991 when he was serving as the minister of communications. He also served as the governor of Västerbotten. He lives in Umeå.

References

External links

1936 births
Living people
Swedish Ministers for Communications
Members of the Riksdag from the Social Democrats
Governors of Västerbotten County
Members of the Riksdag 1970–1973
Members of the Riksdag 1974–1976
Members of the Riksdag 1976–1979
Members of the Riksdag 1979–1982
Members of the Riksdag 1982–1985
Members of the Riksdag 1985–1988